Rafute is a pork belly dish in the Okinawan cuisine of the island of Okinawa, Japan. Rafute is skin-on pork belly stewed in soy sauce and brown sugar. It is traditionally considered to help with longevity.  Rafute was originally a form of Okinawan Royal Cuisine.

In Hawaii, rafute is known as "shoyu pork," which is served in plate lunches. In the early 1900s, Okinawan immigrants in Hawaii introduced rafute into the local cuisine, as ethnic Okinawans owned and ran many restaurants in Honolulu, Hawaii.

Gallery

See also

References

Pork dishes
Okinawan cuisine
Hawaiian cuisine
Japanese cuisine